Rene Mentz (born 26 May 1966) is a South African former professional tennis player.

Mentz, a junior Wimbledon quarterfinalist who was raised in Pretoria, played on the professional tour in the 1980s and early 1990s. She reached a career-high singles ranking of 295 in the world.

During her career she featured in the women's singles main draws of both the French Open and Wimbledon, making the second round of the latter in 1983.

Her best Virginia Slims/WTA Tour performance came at the 1984 Central Fidelity Banks International in Richmond, where she made it through to the quarterfinals, with wins over Leslie Allen and Anna-Maria Fernandez.

ITF finals

Singles: 6 (3–3)

Doubles: 6 (4–2)

References

External links
 
 

1966 births
Living people
South African female tennis players
Sportspeople from Pretoria
White South African people